Martin LaLonde is an American politician who has served in the Vermont House of Representatives since 2014.

References

Living people
University of Michigan Law School alumni
University of Michigan alumni
21st-century American politicians
Democratic Party members of the Vermont House of Representatives
People from Lynwood, California
Year of birth missing (living people)